Payal Fort is a Historic Monument of Punjab, built by Maharaja Amar Singh of Patiala Ryasat in Payal with the co-operation of the
Mughals in 1771.

Nowadays the fort is undertaken by Archaeological Survey of India. Most of the part of The Fort has been renovated by Archaeological Survey of India but some of the interior renovation work is in under process.

In early centuries PAYAL was known as SAHIBGARH, after that Maharaja Amar Singh changed its name. The exact reason behind this does not know by anyone.

The interior of the fort is deteriorating.

See also
Tourism in Punjab, India

References

Buildings and structures in Ludhiana
Forts in Punjab, India